Skjørring is a village and parish in the Municipality of Skanderborg, Jutland, Denmark. As of 1 January 2022 it had a population of 289. Skjørring is located 3 km north of Galten and 21 km west of Aarhus. 

Skjørring Church is a building of note in the village, designed by Vilhelm Theodor Walther.

Notable people 
 Lily Broberg (1923 in Skjørring – 1989) a Danish stage and film actress

References

Cities and towns in the Central Denmark Region
Skanderborg Municipality